Beringia is defined today as the land and maritime area bounded on the west by the Lena River in Russia; on the east by the Mackenzie River in Canada; on the north by 72 degrees north latitude in the Chukchi Sea; and on the south by the tip of the Kamchatka Peninsula. It includes the Chukchi Sea, the Bering Sea, the Bering Strait, the Chukchi and Kamchatka Peninsulas in Russia as well as Alaska in the United States and the Yukon in Canada.

The area includes land lying on the North American Plate and Siberian land east of the Chersky Range. Today, the only land that is visible from the central part of the Bering land bridge are the Diomede Islands, the Pribilof Islands of St. Paul and St. George, St. Lawrence Island, St. Matthew Island, and King Island.

It is believed that a small human population of at most a few thousand arrived in Beringia from eastern Siberia during the Last Glacial Maximum before expanding into the settlement of the Americas sometime after 16,500 years Before Present (YBP). This would have occurred as the American glaciers blocking the way southward melted, but before the bridge was covered by the sea about 11,000 YBP.

Etymology
The term Beringia was coined by the Swedish botanist Eric Hultén in 1937, from the Danish explorer Vitus Bering. During the ice ages, Beringia, like most of Siberia and all of North and Northeast China, was not glaciated because snowfall was very light.

Geography 

The remains of Late Pleistocene mammals that had been discovered on the Aleutians and islands in the Bering Sea at the close of the nineteenth century indicated that a past land connection might lie beneath the shallow waters between Alaska and Chukotka. The underlying mechanism was first thought to be tectonics, but by 1930 changes in the ice mass balance, leading to global sea-level fluctuations were viewed as the cause of the Bering land bridge. In 1937, Eric Hultén proposed that around the Aleutians and the Bering Strait region were tundra plants that had originally dispersed from a now-submerged plain between Alaska and Chukotka, which he named Beringia after the Dane Vitus Bering who had sailed into the strait in 1728. The American arctic geologist David Hopkins redefined Beringia to include portions of Alaska and Northeast Asia. Beringia was later regarded as extending from the Verkhoyansk Mountains in the west to the Mackenzie River in the east. The distribution of plants in the genera Erythranthe and Pinus are good examples of this, as very similar genera members are found in Asia and the Americas.

During the Pleistocene epoch, global cooling led periodically to the expansion of glaciers and the lowering of sea levels. This created land connections in various regions around the globe. A reconstruction of the sea-level history of the region indicated that a seaway existed from  YBP, a land bridge from  YBP, intermittent connection from  YBP, a land bridge from  YBP, followed by a Holocene sea-level rise that reopened the strait. Post-glacial rebound has continued to raise some sections of coast.

During the last glacial period, enough of the earth's water became frozen in the great ice sheets covering North America and Europe to cause a drop in sea levels. For thousands of years the sea floors of many interglacial shallow seas were exposed, including those of the Bering Strait, the Chukchi Sea to the north, and the Bering Sea to the south. Other land bridges around the world have emerged and disappeared in the same way. Around 14,000 years ago, mainland Australia was linked to both New Guinea and Tasmania, the British Isles became an extension of continental Europe via the dry beds of the English Channel and North Sea, and the dry bed of the South China Sea linked Sumatra, Java, and Borneo to Indochina.

Refugium

The last glacial period, commonly referred to as the "Ice Age", spanned 125,000–14,500YBP and was the most recent glacial period within the current ice age, which occurred during the last years of the Pleistocene era. The Ice Age reached its peak during the Last Glacial Maximum, when ice sheets began advancing from 33,000YBP and reached their maximum limits 26,500YBP. Deglaciation commenced in the Northern Hemisphere approximately 19,000YBP and in Antarctica approximately 14,500 yearsYBP, which is consistent with evidence that glacial meltwater was the primary source for an abrupt rise in sea level 14,500YBP and the bridge was finally inundated around 11,000 YBP. The fossil evidence from many continents points to the extinction of large animals, termed Pleistocene megafauna, near the end of the last glaciation.

During the Ice Age a vast, cold and dry Mammoth steppe stretched from the arctic islands southwards to China, and from Spain eastwards across Eurasia and over the Bering land bridge into Alaska and the Yukon where it was blocked by the Wisconsin glaciation. The land bridge existed because sea-levels were lower because more of the planet's water than today was locked up in glaciers. Therefore, the flora and fauna of Beringia were more related to those of Eurasia rather than North America. Beringia received more moisture and intermittent maritime cloud cover from the north Pacific Ocean than the rest of the Mammoth steppe, including the dry environments on either side of it. This moisture supported a shrub-tundra habitat that provided an ecological refugium for plants and animals. In East Beringia 35,000 YBP, the northern arctic areas experienced temperatures  degrees warmer than today but the southern sub-Arctic regions were  degrees cooler. During the LGM 22,000 YBP the average summer temperature was  degrees cooler than today, with variations of  degrees cooler on the Seward Peninsula to  cooler in the Yukon. In the driest and coldest periods of the Late Pleistocene, and possibly during the entire Pleistocene, moisture occurred along a north–south gradient with the south receiving the most cloud cover and moisture due to the air-flow from the North Pacific.

In the Late Pleistocene, Beringia was a mosaic of biological communities. Commencing from  YBP (MIS 3), steppe–tundra vegetation dominated large parts of Beringia with a rich diversity of grasses and herbs. There were patches of shrub tundra with isolated refugia of larch (Larix) and spruce (Picea) forests with birch (Betula) and alder (Alnus) trees. It has been proposed that the largest and most diverse megafaunal community residing in Beringia at this time could only have been sustained in a highly diverse and productive environment. 

Analysis at Chukotka on the Siberian edge of the land bridge indicated that from  YBP (MIS 3 to MIS 2) the environment was wetter and colder than the steppe–tundra to the east and west, with warming in parts of Beringia from  YBP. These changes provided the most likely explanation for mammal migrations after  YBP, as the warming provided increased forage for browsers and mixed feeders. Beringia did not block the movement of most dry steppe-adapted large species such as saiga antelope, woolly mammoth, and caballid horses. However, from the west, the woolly rhino went no further east than the Anadyr River, and from the east North American camels, the American kiang-like equids, the short-faced bear, bonnet-headed muskoxen, and American badger did not travel west. At the beginning of the Holocene, some mesic habitat-adapted species left the refugium and spread westward into what had become tundra-vegetated northern Asia and eastward into northern North America.

The latest emergence of the land bridge was  years ago. However, from  YBP the Laurentide Ice Sheet fused with the Cordilleran Ice Sheet, which blocked gene flow between Beringia (and Eurasia) and continental North America. The Yukon corridor opened between the receding ice sheets  YBP, and this once again allowed gene flow between Eurasia and continental North America until the land bridge was finally closed by rising sea levels  YBP. During the Holocene, many mesic-adapted species left the refugium and spread eastward and westward, while at the same time the forest-adapted species spread with the forests up from the south. The arid adapted species were reduced to minor habitats or became extinct.

Beringia constantly transformed its ecosystem as the changing climate affected the environment, determining which plants and animals were able to survive. The land mass could be a barrier as well as a bridge: during colder periods, glaciers advanced and precipitation levels dropped. During warmer intervals, clouds, rain and snow altered soils and drainage patterns. Fossil remains show that spruce, birch and poplar once grew beyond their northernmost range today, indicating that there were periods when the climate was warmer and wetter. The environmental conditions were not homogenous in Beringia. Recent stable isotope studies of woolly mammoth bone collagen demonstrate that western Beringia (Siberia) was colder and drier than eastern Beringia (Alaska and Yukon), which was more ecologically diverse.

Grey wolves suffered a species-wide population bottleneck (reduction) approximately 25,000 YBP during the Last Glacial Maximum. This was followed by a single population of modern wolves expanding out of their Beringia refuge to repopulate the wolf's former range, replacing the remaining Late Pleistocene wolf populations across Eurasia and North America.

The extinct pine species Pinus matthewsii has been described from Pliocene sediments in the Yukon areas of the refugium.

Human habitation and migration

Around 3,000 years ago, the progenitors of the Yupik peoples  settled along both sides of the straits. The governments of Russia and the United States announced a plan to formally establish "a transboundary area of shared Beringian heritage". Among other things this agreement would establish close ties between the Bering Land Bridge National Preserve and the Cape Krusenstern National Monument in the United States and Beringia National Park in Russia.

Previous connections 

Biogeographical evidence demonstrates previous connections between North America and Asia. Similar dinosaur fossils occur both in Asia and in North America. The dinosaur Saurolophus was found in both Mongolia and western North America.  Relatives of Troodon, Triceratops, and even Tyrannosaurus rex all came from Asia.

The earliest Canis lupus specimen was a fossil tooth discovered at Old Crow, Yukon, Canada. The specimen was found in sediment dated 1 million YBP, however the geological attribution of this sediment is questioned. Slightly younger specimens were discovered at Cripple Creek Sump, Fairbanks, Alaska, in strata dated 810,000 YBP. Both discoveries point to an origin of these wolves in eastern Beringia during the Middle Pleistocene. 

Fossil evidence also indicates an exchange of primates and plants between North America and Asia around 55.8 million years ago. 20 million years ago, evidence in North America shows the last natural interchange of mammalian species. Some, like the ancient saber-toothed cats, have a recurring geographical range: Europe, Africa, Asia, and North America.

See also 

 Bering Strait crossing
 Bluefish Caves
 Little John (archeological site)
 Geologic time scale
 Last glacial period
 Paleoshoreline
 Pleistocene
 Yukon Beringia Interpretive Centre

References

Further reading 
 
 Demuth, Bathsheba (2019) Floating Coast: An Environmental History of the Bering Strait. W. W. Norton & Company. .
 
 
 
 
 Pielou, E. C., After the Ice Age: The Return of Life to Glaciated North America (Chicago: University of Chicago Press) 1992

External links 

 CBC News: New map of Beringia 'opens your imagination' to what landscape looked like 18,000 years ago
 Shared Beringian Heritage Program
 International National Park in the Bering Strait
 Bering Land Bridge National Preserve
 D.K. Jordan, "Prehistoric Beringia" 
 Paleoenvironmental atlas of Beringia: includes animation showing the gradual disappearance of the Bering land bridge
 Yukon Beringia Interpretive Centre
 Paleoenvironments and Glaciation in Beringia
 Study suggests 20000 year hiatus in Beringia
 The Fertile Shore

 
1930s neologisms
Historical geology
Ice ages
Last Glacial Maximum
Pleistocene
Paleo-Indian period
Natural history of North America
Natural history of Asia
Prehistory of the Arctic
Natural history of Russia
Bering Sea
Regions of North America
North Asia